Sharpe's Rifles is the name of two Bernard Cornwell-based works.

 Sharpe's Rifles (novel)
 Sharpe's Rifles (TV programme)

See also 
Sharps rifle